There is no rail transport in Bhutan. 

Bhutan and India signed a memorandum of understanding in January 2005 to connect Bhutan with the Indian Railways network with 5 new routes in Bhutan, additionally Indian Military has also identified more routes to compliment India-China Border Roads (ICBR) & negate 
Siliguri Corridor geostrategic vulnerability, all of which will be built in  broad gauge.

Note: Rail lines listed west to east.

See also 
Transport in Bhutan

References